Hassan Mutlak (1961–1990) was an Iraqi writer, and was hanged in 1990 at the age of 29 for an attempted coup d'état. He was considered among the intellectuals of his country to be the Federico García Lorca of Iraq. He is the brother of the writer and poet Muhsin al-Ramli.

He was one of nine children, having three brothers and five sisters.

Published works
 Dabada (novel)
 The power of laughter in Ura (novel)
 Love is running on a wall (short stories)
 Alfa-Hassan-beto (short stories)
 The book of love ... the shadows of them on the ground (memory of Love)
 The eye in (daily)
 The writing stands (Test)
 The masks... You, the homeland and I (Poetry)

External links
 http://hassanmutlak.blogspot.com/
4 Poems 

Dabada 

El cultural

References 

1990 deaths
1961 births
20th-century Iraqi poets
Iraqi writers
Arabic-language novelists
Iraqi male short story writers
20th-century poets
20th-century short story writers
People executed by Iraq by hanging
20th-century male writers